Kratié, also spelled Kracheh, is the capital of Kratié Province in eastern Cambodia. It is also a sangkat within Kratié Municipality.

Geography 
The small town has a population of about 38,215 and lies on the banks of the Mekong River. The city is dominated by a central marketplace surrounded by old, French colonial buildings. Red flowered trees grow in rows along the riverbank. The town includes big islands with white sand beaches within the Mekong. The stretch of river north of the city is home to a group of rare Irrawaddy dolphins. The dolphins are the town's main tourist attraction.

A survey conducted in 2007 by Cambodian Mekong Dolphin Conservation Project (CMDCP), a collaborative project between WWF, World Conservation Society, Fisheries Administration and Cambodian Rural Development Team (CRDT), estimated that there are between 66 and 86 dolphins left in the upper Cambodian Mekong area.

Gallery

References

Provincial capitals in Cambodia
Cities in Cambodia
Populated places in Kratié province
Populated places on the Mekong River